"Music Is The One-T ODC" is the first single taken from One-T's first album, The One-T ODC.

Song 
The song is a house/pop song. It has been released during the summer of 2001. The lyrics deal with the power of music and are meant to be joyful. On the reissue of the first album, the title of the song has been changed to "Odyssey".
As an inspiration for this song was a recording titled "Ma Hra" composed in 1971 by Radim Hladík from the Czech rock band called Blue Effect.

Video 
The video for the song is a cartoon. It shows One-T as a DJ in a party and then, being involved with his friends in a fight against Travoltino, his biggest enemy.

Charts 
Music Is The One-T ODC peaked at the 12th position of the French Charts and was the 82nd best seller of 2001 in France. The single has been certified Silver and sales are estimated at 200 000.

2001 singles
One-T songs
Songs about music
2001 songs